Poetry London: A Bi-Monthly of Modern Verse and Criticism was a leading London-based literary periodical published intermittently between 1939 and 1951. It was edited by Meary James Thurairajah Tambimuttu.

Contributors included Dylan Thomas, Herbert Read, Stephen Spender, George Barker, Lawrence Durrell.

References

Further reading 

Dickins, Anthony. "Tambimuttu and Poetry London". London Magazine 5.8 (1965).

Defunct literary magazines published in the United Kingdom
Magazines established in 1939
Magazines disestablished in 1951
Magazines published in London
Poetry magazines published in the United Kingdom